"Christian De Metter" (born 1968) is a French comic book artist.

Biography

De Metter studied advertising design and got his start in the music press. His first published book, Emma, was released in 2000.  In 2005 he won a prize at the Angoulême International Comics Festival.  He provided the internal art for the graphic novel adaptation of Dennis Lehane's Shutter Island.

Bibliography
Comics work includes:

Emma (script and art, in Triskel, Soleil, 2000, collected, 2002)
Dusk (with writer Richard Marazano, Les Humanoïdes Associés, 2000–2002, collected, 2007)
Le curé (with Laurent Lacoste, in Triskel, Soleil, 2001–2003, collected 2004)
Le sang des Valentines (with writer Catel Muller, Casterman, 2004)
Swinging London (with writer Thomas Bénet, Soleil, 2004–2005)
Vers le démon (script and art, Casterman, 2006)
Figurec (script and art, Casterman, 2007)
L'oeil était dans la tombe (script and art, Casterman, 2008)
Marilyn, de l'autre côté du miroir (script and art, Casterman, 2009)
Shutter Island (with writer Dennis Lehane, graphic novel, William Morrow, January 2010)

Awards
Awards include:

 2004: Nominated for the Angoulême International Comics Festival Prize for Artwork, for Le curé
 2005:
 Won the Angoulême International Comics Festival Prize Awarded by the Audience, for Le sang des Valentines
 Nominated for Angoulême International Comics Festival Prize for Scenario, for Le sang des Valentines

Notes

External links

Christian de Metter at Bedetheque 
Christian de Metter at Lambiek's Comiclopedia

Biography 

Writers from Paris
Living people
1968 births
French male writers